Allan James Stewart (born 11 October 1940) is a former New Zealand rugby union player. 

A lock, Stewart played for Timaru Old Boys before he represented South Canterbury and Canterbury at a provincial level, and was a member of the New Zealand national side, the All Blacks, from 1963 to 1964. He played 26 matches for the All Blacks including eight internationals.

References

1940 births
Living people
Rugby union players from Timaru
People educated at Mountainview High School
University of Canterbury alumni
New Zealand rugby union players
New Zealand international rugby union players
South Canterbury rugby union players
Canterbury rugby union players
Rugby union locks